Wellington Rural District may refer to two former districts in England:

Wellington Rural District, Shropshire
Wellington Rural District, Somerset